The Chief of the Hellenic Navy General Staff (abbrev. Α/ΓΕΝ) is the head of the Hellenic Navy General Staff and commander of the Hellenic Navy. The position is customarily held by a three-star flag officer (vice admiral). As part of Greece's membership in NATO, from 1967 until 1999 the Chief of the HNGS was also commander of NATO's COMEDEAST.

List of chiefs

Notes

References

Sources
 

 
Greece
Lists of Greek military personnel